The Mestský štadión is a multi-purpose stadium in Púchov, Slovakia, currently used mostly for football matches. It is the home ground of FK Púchov and holds a capacity of 6,080 people.

References

Football venues in Slovakia
Buildings and structures in Trenčín Region
Sport in Trenčín Region